Fair Play (in the original Swedish Rent spel) is a novel by Finnish author Tove Jansson, first published in 1989.

Plot
The novel portrays the romantic relationship between two women doing artistic work, Jonna and Mari, who live in separate apartments in the same house (alluding to Jansson's relationship with Tuulikki Peitila). They are in many ways quite different, but maybe because of this they are able to complete each other. It is about give and take, compromises and communication, and how the relationship survives even if it changes when the people do.

Many chapters in the book are written such that they can be read stand-alone, and a few have been republished in the short story collection A Winter Book.

References

1989 novels
20th-century Finnish novels
Swedish-language novels